Os Travessos is a group of pagode created in the city of São Paulo by the members Rodriguinho, Fabinho, Rodrigão, Chorão, and Edimilson Salvino in the year of 1996.

History

The group has origins from the East Zone of São Paulo initially having the name of Toca do Coelho, in 1990. In 1995 the group named themselves Muleke Travesso, and two years later they changed to Os Travessos.

In 2004, vocalist Rodriguinho left the group to follow a solo career, followed by Fabinho in 2005.

The current vocalist, Filipe Duarte, who joined in 2006, is a former member of the group Br'oz. The 1st single with Filipe in the band was called Te liguei, a romantic pagode.

In 2007, Fabinho Mello (Fábio Borges Mello), died of a heart attack.

in 2014, after 10 years Rodriguinho back integrate 'Os Travessos'

Members

Actual formation

 Rodriguinho (1992 - 2004, 2014 - now)
 Filipe (2006–) – vocal
 Chorão – percussion
 Rodrigo – percussion
 Edimilson – bass

Former members

 Fabinho (1992–2005) – voice and keyboard

Discography

Albums

 Frente a frente (2007)
 Warner 30 Anos: Os Travessos (2006)
 Pura Mágica (2005)
 Os Travessos – Ao Vivo (2004)
 Dito e Feito (2003)
 Os Travessos (2002)
 Perfil (2001)
 Adivinha (2000)
 Declarações (1999)
 Os Travessos (1999)
 Nossa Dança (1996)

Videography

DVDs

 Os Travessos – Ao Vivo (2003)

Prizes

 Golden and Platinum Disc with the album Nossa Dança
 Golden Disc with the album Os Travessos
 Prize Prêmio VMB 2000 MTV for Best Vídeo Clip of Pagode with the music Meu Querubim

External links
 Os Travessos
 Canal Pop: Os Travessos

References 

Article translated from Lusophone Wikipedia

Brazilian musical groups
Pagode musical groups
1996 establishments in Brazil
Musical groups established in 1996
Musical groups from São Paulo